Cylichnidia is a genus of air-breathing land snails, terrestrial pulmonate gastropod mollusks in the family Ferussaciidae.

Species
Species within the genus Cylichnidia include:
 Cylichnidia ovuliformis

References

External links 
 Fauna Europaea info
 ZipCodeZoo info

Ferussaciidae
Taxonomy articles created by Polbot